Rozwadza  is a village in the administrative district of Gmina Zdzieszowice, within Krapkowice County, Opole Voivodeship, in south-western Poland.

The village has a population of 1,100.

References

Rozwadza